The Juno Award for Adult Alternative Album of the Year, administered by Canadian Academy of Recording Arts and Sciences (CARAS), has been awarded since 2005 to recognize the best album in the adult alternative genre by a Canadian artist.

Winners and nominees

References

Adult Alternative
Album awards